Saint-Marcel-de-Careiret is a commune in the Gard department in southern France.

Population

See also
Communes of the Gard department

References

External links
Official Web site

Communes of Gard